Vellamullivaikal is a small town in Sri Lanka. It is located within the Mullaitivu District, Northern Province. The village is notable as the place where the final battle was fought in Sri Lankan Civil War.

See also
List of towns in Northern Province, Sri Lanka

References

External links

Populated places in Northern Province, Sri Lanka